Cuiabá Light Rail is an unfinished light rail in the Brazilian city of Cuiabá, Mato Grosso. Work on the line has been suspended since 2015 due to suspicion of bidder fraud. As of 2021, there is no intention to finish the construction and the system is to be replaced by BRT.

The light rail system was designed to connect Cuiabá ("Centro Político Administrativo") with Cuiabá International Airport in the city of Várzea Grande.

Planned system

Cuiabá's Light Rail was planned to be  in length, operating on two lines:

References

Electric railways in Brazil
Tram and light rail transit systems under construction
Unfinished buildings and structures